Maurizio Di Gati (born July 10, 1966 in Racalmuto) is a Sicilian mafioso and considered to be the boss of the Agrigento province before his arrest in November 2006.

Background
Di Gati was born in Racalmuto, in the province of Agrigento, the hometown of the famous Sicilian writer Leonardo Sciascia. He became a barber. However, when in 1991 his elder brother Diego Di Gati was killed in a vendetta with a rival mafia-like group, the Stidda, he decided to become a 'man of honour' to avenge his brother.

He was supposed to be made capoprovincia at a meeting of Mafia families from Agrigento on July 14, 2002 in Santa Margherita di Belice. Di Gati was sponsored by Antonino Giuffrè, while Bernardo Provenzano preferred Giuseppe Falsone from Campobello di Licata.

Disappearance and capture
However, the police interrupted the summit. Di Gati was able to escape before the raid. He stepped aside as provincial boss for Falsone due to the opposition of Provenzano to his position and after the arrest of Giuffrè.

Di Gati was arrested on November 25, 2006, in Villaggio Mosè, near Agrigento. He was a fugitive since 1999, when he was convicted to six years incarceration for Mafia conspiracy. In December 2006 he decided to become a collaborating state witness and whisteblower on the cosa nostra corleonesi clan (pentito).

References

1966 births
Living people
Pentiti
People from Racalmuto
Gangsters from the Province of Agrigento